Basilica of Saint Sebastian or St. Sebastian may refer to:

 Basilica of St. Sebastian, Salvador, in Salvador, Brazil
 Basilica of St. Sebastian, Barcellona Pozzo di Gotto, in Barcellona Pozzo di Gotto, Sicily
 Basilica of St. Sebastian Outside the Walls, otherwise the Basilica di San Sebastiano fuori le mura or San Sebastiano ad Catacumbas, Rome
 Basilica of St. Sebastian, Manila, otherwise San Sebastian Church (Manila), Philippines
 Basilica of St. Sebastian, Diriamba, Nicaragua